Waldsteinia, the barren strawberries, is a genus of the rose family (Rosaceae).  It contains about six species native to the temperate Northern Hemisphere.  A number of species are cultivated as a ground cover in gardens, including Waldsteinia fragarioides from North America, Waldsteinia geoides from Europe, Waldsteinia lobata, and Waldsteinia ternata from Eurasia (from Central Europe to Siberia, China, and Japan).

References

External links
 

Colurieae
Rosaceae genera
Taxa named by Carl Ludwig Willdenow